Richard John Bittner (January 12, 1922 – March 24, 2002) was an American professional ice hockey goaltender who played in one National Hockey League game during the 1949–50 season. His lone game was with the Boston Bruins on February 12, 1950 against the Montreal Canadiens as a replacement for the injured Jack Gelineau. The rest of his career, which lasted from 1943 to 1955, was mainly spent in the amateur Eastern Amateur Hockey League. Internationally Bittner played for the American national team at the 1949 World Championships.

Career statistics

Regular season and playoffs

International

See also
List of players who played only one game in the NHL

References

External links

Richard Bittner, Sports-Reference / Hockey-Reference.com. Retrieved 2019-03-16.

1922 births
2002 deaths
American men's ice hockey goaltenders
Atlantic City Sea Gulls (EHL) players
Boston Bruins players
Boston Olympics players
Ice hockey people from New Haven, Connecticut
Minneapolis Millers (IHL) players
New Haven Blades players
New Haven Eagles players
San Francisco Shamrocks (PCHL) players
Springfield Indians players
St. Paul Saints (IHL) players
Washington Lions players